S. S. Palanimanickam (born 15 August 1950) is an Indian politician from Tamil Nadu. He was a member of the 15th Lok Sabha  of India. He represented the Thanjavur constituency of Tamil Nadu from the Dravida Munnetra Kazhagam (DMK) party. He was the Thanjavur district secretary of the Dravida Munnetra Kazhagam.

He had been a member of parliament for five times, winning five continuous elections starting 1996. He was also the minister of state in the ministry of finance from 2004 to March 2012 when the DMK pulled out of the ruling UPA coalition government.
Internal rivalry in the DMK party emerged between T. R. Baalu and S.S. Palanimanickam in 2012, when T. R. Baalu initiated a survey for railway lines in Thanjavur district and T. R. Baalu wished to contest from Thanjavur in 2014 Indian general election and the DMK  controversially denied Palanimanickam a ticket however Baalu lost the elections. However Palanimanickam was given the party ticket in the 2019 Indian general election and was elected to the Lok Sabha, lower house of the Parliament of India from Thanjavur  again.

Career as a politician
Palanimanickam joined the DMK during the Anti-Hindi agitation of 1965 through his father Subbiah Vanniyar was a staunch Congress party worker and an aide of R Venkataraman and G K Moopanar.   General-Secretary, All India Peace and Solidarity, Tamil Nadu Unit; His interest are toward working for the upliftment of weaker sections of the society and has special interests in rural education and upliftment of the rural youth. He led a delegation of students to the then U.S.S.R. for attending youth festival, attended UN General Assembly in 2001-02 in New York, attended SAARC Parliamentarians Conference in Bangladesh, visited Egypt and South Africa as member of Indian Parliamentary Delegation during 13th Lok Sabha, visited Arab Countries as member of Peace Delegation in 2004. In 2012, S. S. Palanimanickam signed a Tax Information Exchange Agreement with Monaco, being the 9th TIEA signed by India.

Elections contested and positions held

Controversies
In February 2012, CBI lodged strong protest with CVC on the "dirty tricks" of certain Income Tax officials to intimidate crucial witnesses in the 2G spectrum case allegedly at the behest of Minister of State (Finance) SS Palanimanickam. Dr. Swamy, one of the petitioners in the case, said he would approach Supreme Court on this matter.

Internal rivalry in the DMK party emerged between Baalu and S.S. Palanimanickam, the MP from Thanjavur constituency and the district secretary of the DMK in Thanjavur. During October 2012, Palanimackam came out open in the media to criticize his senior colleague for showing undue interest in Thanjavur, while he could have done it was his Sriperumbudur constituency. He accused Baalu for bringing all the railways schemes to Thanjavur to get the seat in Thanjavur for 2014 general elections. Referring to the internal conflict, the party leader Karunanidhi came out in the open stating "When I go to sleep, such factional feuds engulf me and make me sleepless". Baalu being the Chairman of the Parliamentary Standing Committee on Railways, initiated the survey for the  Thanjavur-Pattukottai railway line and the  Mannargudi-Pattukottai rail project, which is believed to have created the conflict.

References

External links
 Official biographical sketch in Parliament of India website

Living people
Indian Tamil people
Lok Sabha members from Tamil Nadu
1950 births
India MPs 2004–2009
India MPs 2009–2014
India MPs 2019–present
Union ministers of state of India
Dravida Munnetra Kazhagam politicians
Union Ministers from Tamil Nadu
People from Pudukkottai district
India MPs 1996–1997
India MPs 1998–1999
India MPs 1999–2004
People from Thanjavur district